Matthias Schultheiss (born 27 July 1946) is a German graphic novel artist. He is known, especially in France for his works Bell's Theorem and The Sharks of Lagos published in the mid to late-1980s.

Life and work 

Schultheiss was born in Nuremberg. He originally took an education in cabinet-making, then went on to study illustration at Hochschule für bildende Künste Hamburg. His first graphic novel called Trucker appeared in 1981 as a serial in the German magazine Comic-Reader, and he published two comic adaptations of short stories by Charles Bukowski. His 1985 graphic novel Kalter Krieg ("Cold War") was indexed as harmful to minors by the Federal Department for Media Harmful to Young Persons, not due to its depiction of sex and violence, but because of its bleak, pessimistic nihilism.

His breakthrough came when Franco-Belgian comics magazine L'Écho des savanes published his graphic novels Bell's Theorem and The Sharks of Lagos as serials from 1985 onwards. Both were reprinted in three volumes each by Éditions Albin Michel in France, Carlsen Verlag in Germany, and Bell's Theorem has been published in English by Catalan Communications. In 1986, he received the Max & Moritz Prize as Best German-Language Comic Artist.

In the early 1990s, Schultheiss as one of several European comic artists was contacted by Kodansha for a new series of manga-style comics by European artists to be called Im Zentrum des Wahnsinns ("In the Center of Madness"). When a lot of work had already gone into the project, Kodansha suddenly cancelled its plans, and Schultheiss's 400 pages he had drawn so far were never released (up until in May 2001, the German mail-order publisher Hummelcomic began issuing one page of it per day on its website). Schultheiss next intended to get on the American market in 1993 with his own superhero series, entitled Propellerman. But this turned out a flop, and for the rest of the 1990s, Schultheiss withdrew from making comics, only teaching graphics illustration classes in Hamburg, his city of residence, and occasionally wrote scripts for telefilms.

In 2008, he returned with two graphic novels originally published by Kodansha, "Woman on the River" and "Daddy", and in 2010, he published "Journey with Bill" at Glénat. They present a much brighter, more colorful, and more optimistic style compared to his bleak and darkly disturbing work of the 1980s and early 1990s.

Main publications

German 

Kalter Krieg, Melzer 1985
Die Wahrheit über Shelby
Lebenslänglich, Carlsen 1986
Die Verbindung, Carlsen 1987
Der Kontakt, Carlsen 1988
Die Haie von Lagos
Schwarze Seelen, Carlsen 1987
Lamberts Beute, Carlsen 1988
Die Spur, Carlsen 1988
Nighttaxi, Carlsen 1990
Talk Dirty, 1991
Reise mit Bill, Splitter 2010

French 

Guerres froides, Albin Michel 1985
Le théorème de Bell
Le théorème de Bell, Albin Michel 1986
Le contact, Albin Michel 1988
La solution, Albin Michel 1990
Le rêve du requin
La fourmilière du Lagos, Glénat 1986
Lagos connection, Glénat 1988
La Fiancée de la mort, Glénat 1990
Night Taxi, Glénat 1990
Sois vicieux, Delcourt 2010
Le voyage avec Bill, Glénat 2010

English 

Bell's Theorem
Bell's Theorem #1: Lifer, Catalan Communications 1987
Bell's Theorem #2: The Connection, Catalan Communications 1988
Bell's Theorem #3: Contact, Catalan Communications 1989
A Couple of Winos, Fantagraphics 1991
Propellerman, Dark Horse 1993
Talk Dirty, Eros Comix 1997

External links
Entry on Lambiek Comiclopedia
Short entry on Comic Book Database
McCulloch, Joe (2011). THIS WEEK IN COMICS! (3/16/11 – Winds of Change), 15 March 2011, The Comics Journal (contains a 6-paragraph review of Schultheiss's comic Propellerman)

1946 births
Living people
German comics artists
German comics writers
Writers from Nuremberg